The Kyrgyzstan national ice hockey team is the national men's ice hockey team of Kyrgyzstan. They are controlled by the Ice Hockey Federation of the Kyrgyz Republic and has been an associate member of the International Ice Hockey Federation (IIHF). As of 2022, Kyrgyzstan is ranked 49th in the IIHF World Ranking.

History
Kyrgyzstan played its first game in 1962 during the Winter Spartakiad which was held in Sverdlovsk, USSR, in which they represented the Kirghiz Soviet Socialist Republic. Kyrgyzstan played seven games, winning both games against the Armenian SSR and losing five to the Ukrainian SSR, the Estonian SSR, the Latvian SSR, the Georgian SSR and the Lithuanian SSR respectively. 

In 2011 Kyrgyzstan returned to international play, when they competed in the Premier Division of the 2011 Asian Winter Games. In the first game of the tournament, Kyrgyzstan recorded their first ever win, defeating Thailand 15–4. Kyrgyzstan went on to win the Premier Division after winning all six of their games and finishing on top of the table. 

Kyrgyzstan made its debut in the World Championships in 2019, playing in the Division III qualification tournament held in Abu Dhabi, United Arab Emirates. They finished first after winning all five games. However, all their first four games were later voided and the results were counted as 5–0 forfeits due to Kyrgyzstan's player Aleksandr Titov being disqualified. Later IIHF acknowledged they had made a mistake, but the results would still stand. Tournaments in 2020 and 2021 were cancelled due to the COVID-19 pandemic, but Kyrgyzstan hosted the 2022 Division IV tournament.

Tournament record

World Championships

Asian Winter Games

Challenge Cup of Asia

All-time record against other nations
Last match update: 15 December 2019

Notes

References

External links
IIHF profile

National ice hockey teams in Asia
Ice hockey
Nat